Francis Tyssen Amhurst (27 September 1842 – 3 January 1881) was a solicitor and Member of the Queensland Legislative Assembly.

Early life
Francis Amhurst was born in Framlingham, Suffolk, in 1842 to William Amhurst and his wife Mary (née Fountaine) .  He attended Eton College and went on to  Christ Church University,  Oxford. He travelled overseas for two years after completing University and arrived in Queensland 1872. He set up buying various investments and by 1875 he was owner of Foulden Sugar Plantation in Mackay.

Politics
Winning the seat of Bowen in 1875, Amhurst held the seat for two years before resigning in 1877. The next year he contested and won Mackay, holding it till his death in 1881.

Death
Before his death, Amhurst had been in poor health. Hoping a change would help him recuperate, he sailed on the SS Bokhara bound for England, but died at sea on 3 January 1881.

References

Members of the Queensland Legislative Assembly
1842 births
1881 deaths
People educated at Eton College
Alumni of Christ Church, Oxford
19th-century Australian politicians
People from Framlingham